Roslyn House is a historic hotel located at Roslyn Heights in Nassau County, New York.  It was built about 1870 and is a two-story Italianate style building.  It is a rectangular, five-bay-wide frame building, clad in clapboards and set on a brick foundation.  It has a hipped roof.  It features a second-story porch along the front and south facades supported by Doric order columns.

It was added to the National Register of Historic Places in 1990.

References

Hotel buildings on the National Register of Historic Places in New York (state)
Italianate architecture in New York (state)
Houses completed in 1870
Buildings and structures in Nassau County, New York
National Register of Historic Places in Nassau County, New York
1870 establishments in New York (state)